EHS may refer to:

Education 
 Early Head Start, an American educational program
 EHS Institute, a teacher training program in Hardwick, Massachusetts, United States

Schools

Disambiguation 
 East High School (disambiguation)
 Eastern High School (disambiguation)
 Edison High School (disambiguation)
 Elkins High School (disambiguation)
 Enterprise High School (disambiguation)
 Episcopal High School (disambiguation)
 Essex High School (disambiguation)
 Eureka High School (disambiguation)
 Evergreen High School (disambiguation)

Australia 
 Engadine High School, Sydney, New South Wales

Canada 
 Esquimalt High School, Esquimalt, British Columbia

India 
 Edrakpur High School, Birbhum district, West Bengal

South Africa 
 Ermelo High School, Ermelo, Mpumalanga

United States 
 Eagan High School, Eagan, Minnesota
 Eagle High School, Eagle, Idaho
 Eagle Hill School, Hardwick, Massachusetts
 Eastmont High School, East Wenatchee, Washington
 Ellendale High School (Ellendale School District), Ellendale, North Dakota
 Ellensburg High School, Ellensburg, Washington
 Elsinore High School, Wildomar, California
 Empire High School, Tucson, Arizona
 Escondido High School, Escondido, California
 Etna High School, in Etna, California

Health and medicine 
 EHS Today, an occupational safety and health magazine
 Emergency Health Services, in Nova Scotia, Canada
 Emergency Hospital Service, in the United Kingdom during World War II
 Emergency Hospital Service (Scotland)
 Environment, health and safety
 Exploding head syndrome
 Exertional heat stroke; see Heat stroke

Science and technology 
 Electromagnetic hypersensitivity, claimed sensitivity to mobile phone towers etc. 
 Electronic hook switch, in connecting a wireless headset to a phone 
 European Home Systems Protocol, a communication protocol using power line communication 
 Microsoft Exchange Hosted Services
 Engelbreth-Holm-Swarm matrix, extracellular protein mixture known as Matrigel

Other uses 
 Early Harvest Scheme, a trade agreement
 Ecclesiastical History Society
 Economic History Society
 Eternal Haunted Summer, an American literary magazine